Slattery is a surname of Irish origin. The name originated in the townland of Ballyslattery in the barony of Tulla Upper in east County Clare, Ireland.

The Slattery coat of arms which shows three red submissive lions against a white background indicates a family that are magnanimous in warfare and yet kind and warm in peacetime.

Notable people named Slattery include:

 Bevan Slattery, Australian technology entrepreneur
 Brian Slattery, Canadian academic
 Edward James Slattery, American Roman Catholic bishop
 Fergus Slattery, Irish rugby union player
 Francis Slattery, American naval submarine commander
 Harry A. Slattery, American lawyer and statesman
 Henry Slattery, Australian football player
 Jack Slattery, American baseball player
 James M. Slattery, United States Senator 
 Jim Slattery, United States politician
 Jimmy Slattery, New York boxer
 John Henry Slattery, Colorado businessman
 John Slattery, American actor
 Joseph Patrick Slattery, Australian physicist, radiologist, Catholic priest
 Martin Slattery, British musician
 Michael Slattery (archbishop), Irish priest
 Michael Slattery (hurler), Irish hurler
 Michael Slattery (Gaelic footballer), Irish Gaelic footballer
 Michael Slattery (admiral), Justice of the Supreme Court of New South Wales and Judge Advocate General of the Australian Defence Force
 Mike Slattery (baseball), Major League Baseball player
 Mike Slattery (politician), Democratic member of the Kansas House of Representatives
 Richard X. Slattery, American actor
 Ryan Slattery, American film and television actor
 Tadhg Slattery, South African swimmer who competed in six Paralympic Games
 Tony Slattery, English actor and comedian
 Troy Slattery, Australian rugby league footballer

Fictional characters with the name Slattery include:
 Trevor Slattery, a character in the Marvel Cinematic Universe

See also
Slattery Report, 1939–40 report into Alaskan development through immigration
Slattery's Hurricane, 1949 American film
Slattery's People, 1964–65 American television series
"Slattery's Mounted Foot", 1889 comic song by the Irish musician Percy French

References

Irish families
Surnames of Irish origin